Nummedal is a surname. Notable people with the surname include:

Anders Nummedal (1867–1944), Norwegian archaeologist
Christian Nummedal (born 1995), Norwegian freestyle skier
Tara Nummedal, American historian of alchemy

Norwegian-language surnames